This is a complete list of the songs known to have been written or co-written by L.A. Reid (1983–1993).

Reid